The Plymouth Satellite is a mid-size automobile introduced in the 1965 model year as the top trim model in Plymouth's "B" platform Belvedere line.  Available initially in two-door hardtop and convertible models, the Satellite remained the top-of-the-line model until the 1967 model year. A station wagon version was added and a higher "Sport" trim introduced.

The Fury name was moved to Plymouth's mid-size models for 1975, at which time the Satellite name was discontinued.

First generation (1965-1967) 

When the new, larger Plymouth Fury was introduced for 1965 on Chrysler's full-size C platform, the Plymouth Belvedere name was moved to Plymouth's "new" mid-size line for 1965. The Belvedere Satellite was the top trim model in the series, above the Belvedere I and II. It was available in two-door hardtop or convertible versions. Bucket seats and a center console were standard equipment, as well as a V8 engine. This 426 had the wedge combustion chamber design and is not the 426 "Hemi" that was offered in 1966. The front end featured single headlights on each side, and a grille divided into four thin rectangles laid horizontally.

The 1965 Satellite two-door hardtop total production was 23,341 units. Convertible production was 1,860 units.

The 1966 redesigned Satellite was available with a "Street Hemi" engine with two 4-barrel carburetors and 10.25:1 compression.

The 1967 Satellite was a carryover from 1966, but there were several trim changes. A new grille featured dual side-by-side headlights, a change in the rear trunk finish panel and taillights included multiple horizontal ribs. New horizontal aluminum trim at the lower body crease with lower silver paint gave all 1967 Satellites essentially a two-tone paint scheme. For 1966 and 1967, the interior vinyl seats and door panels were treated to a unique 'Western Scroll' design which mimicked tooled leather in appearance. This was the 'premium' interior shared with the GTX in 1967. For 1966 and 1967 the Satellite was again offered only in 2-door hardtop and convertible body styles and was powered by V8 engines.

Production figures for 1966 were 35,399 hardtops and 2,759 convertibles.

Second generation (1968-1970) 

A restyled and higher trimmed Sport Satellite model with a standard 318 V8 was introduced in 1968, sitting above the regular Satellites. The Sport Satellite received the same blacked-out grille with horizontal blades as used on the Road Runner whereas the regular Satellite shared its grille with Belvederes. A 4-door sedan and station wagon were offered on the Satellite line for the first time. There were no Sport Satellite sedans in 1968, but a Satellite Sport Wagon was available. These had Sport Satellite trim and simulated woodgrain body side trim. A Sport Satellite four-door sedan was added to the lineup in 1969, and the wagons became a part of the regular Sport Satellite line.

The 1968 model year was also the introduction of the Plymouth Road Runner that shared the same body as the Satellite and Belvedere models.

The 1968 body continued through 1970, with new grilles in 1969 and a minor front and rear restyling for 1970, which was the last year for the Belvedere name.

Third generation (1971-1974) 

A new design was introduced for the 1971 model year. The Satellite adopted new "fuselage" styling - in line with the facelifts on the larger Chrysler C-Body models - on the two-door, four-door, and wagon models. Unlike previous years, 4-door sedans and 2-door coupes did not share sheet metal and each carried unique styling. Sedans were available in base, Custom, and Brougham trim, while two-doors were available in 5 trim levels. All VIN numbers started with the letter R for Satellite followed by the letter for the trim ordered RL(LOW)code was the base model for the Satellite, RM (Medium) Satellite Roadrunner, RH (High) Satellite Sebring, RP (Premium) Satellite Sebring Plus and top-of-the-line RS (Special) Satellite GTX. Two-door models had a loop-type front bumper, 2-door coupes had a wheelbase of 115 inches, while 4-door sedans, as well as station wagons, had a wheelbase of 117 inches.

For the 1973 model year, the two-door models – received a more conventional front-end design, with squared-up sheet metal and rear side windows. Safety requirements for the 1974 model year included  bumpers for the sedans and wagons. The Satellite name was dropped after 1974, after which Plymouth's intermediate offerings on the B-body chassis took the Plymouth Fury name. The Satellite Sebring, named for the Sebring International Raceway in Sebring, Florida, was replaced by the Chrysler Cordoba (a car which was originally intended to be called Plymouth Sebring)  and shared an all-new body with the Dodge Charger. The Sebring name would be revived by Chrysler on an unrelated model in 1995.

References

External links

 Allpar.com Satellite section
 

Satellite
Rear-wheel-drive vehicles
Mid-size cars
Convertibles
Coupés
Sedans
Station wagons
1970s cars
Cars introduced in 1965